Kilbuck can refer to:
 John and Edith Kilbuck, missionaries
 Kilbuck Township, Pennsylvania

See also
 Killbuck (disambiguation)